101 Ranch may refer to:

 101 Ranch Boys, American country western band
 Miller Brothers 101 Ranch, a ranch in the Indian Territory of Oklahoma before statehood
 The 101 Ranch, a 1937 book about the Miller Brothers ranch by Ellsworth Collings and Alma Miller England